Charles Cahill may refer to:

 Charles Cahill (ice hockey) (1904–1954), Canadian ice hockey player
 Charles Cahill (rugby league) (1916–2007), Australian rugby league footballer and coach